Ballavarry Burial Mound is a Bronze Age burial mound in the parish of Andreas on the Isle of Man. It is located by Ballavarry farm entrance on a low hill, a short distance from Andreas village. The mound is significant and survives to a height of 3m and a diameter of 15m.

Although a burial urn was discovered during a 19th-century investigation of the mound, it has since been lost.

References 

History of the Isle of Man
Historic sites in the Isle of Man
Tumuli